{{DISPLAYTITLE:2010 AU118}}

 (also written 2010 AU118) is a potential Amor near-Earth asteroid with an observation arc of only 1.4 days and thus a poorly determined orbit. It was announced on 27 May 2010 based on images taken by the Wide-field Infrared Survey Explorer (WISE) on 13–15 January 2010. It was removed from the Sentry Risk Table on 14 June 2014 as a result of an update to the Sentry software. Another software update restored it to the Sentry Risk Table in 2017. It was again removed from the sentry list on 3 October 2018.

 was observed 19 times over a very short observation arc of 1.4 days during 13–15 January 2010. The asteroid's orbit might not get closer than Mars and/or reach beyond Jupiter.

WISE estimates the asteroid to be  in diameter. In 2018,  was the largest object listed on the Sentry Risk Table. It has a poorly constrained orbit with an uncertainty parameter of 9. Virtual clones of the asteroid that fit the uncertainty region in the known trajectory, showed a 1 in 770 million chance that the asteroid could impact the Earth on 2020 October 20.

References

External links 
 
 
 

Minor planet object articles (unnumbered)
Lost minor planets

20100527